A papulopustular condition is a condition composed of both papule and pustules.

Examples of papulopustular conditions include:
Papulopustular rosacea
Papulopustular acne
Sycosis

References

Dermatologic terminology